Gulf Breeze High School is a public secondary school located at 675 Gulf Breeze Parkway in Gulf Breeze, Florida. It is one of eleven high schools of the Santa Rosa County School District and the only high school in the city of Gulf Breeze.

For 2020, U.S. News & World Report ranked Gulf Breeze High #1 (out of 29) in Pensacola, FL Metro Area High Schools and #112 (out of 1,088) in Florida High Schools.

History
It opened in 1971. It had 600 students in 1971, about 1,300 circa 1999, and 1,410 in 2000.It currently has a little over 2,000 students attending in the 2022-2023 school year.

Facility
The school is contained within five structures and encompasses both sides of U.S. Route 98. In addition to a large main entrance building, Gulf Breeze High consists of an Art and Drama Department building, a Foreign Language Department building, an ESE building, and a Band and Music Department building.

Additional adjacent facilities include six tennis courts, basketball courts, a baseball complex, three practice fields for soccer, football and lacrosse, and a large stadium. On August 4, 2010, a $1.5 million field house addition was completed. In 2014, new baseball and softball field houses were completed, in 2015 the baseball complex received a face lift so all buildings would match and be aesthetically pleasing and coordinate in color; the spectator stands were covered for sun protection and in 2016 a new softball indoor batting facility was completed.

Adjacent to the high school are Gulf Breeze Elementary School and Gulf Breeze Middle School, creating a large educational campus in the heart of the small Gulf Breeze peninsula. The high quality of all three schools and the geographically limited land mass of Gulf Breeze are often credited in combination for bolstering property values on the peninsula.

Communities served

Most high school-aged children in Pensacola Beach in Escambia County attend Gulf Breeze High, even though they are zoned to Escambia County School District's Pensacola High School.

Student Body
As of 2017, 85% are White, non-Hispanic, 6% are Hispanic, 5% are Asian/Pacific Islander, 3% are Native American/Alaskan Native, and less than 1% are Black, non-Hispanic.

In 2016, 21.4% of GBHS students were eligible for free or reduced lunch programs.

In 2016, 64.7% of GBHS teachers held a bachelor's degree, 33.8% held a master's degree, and 1.5% held a Doctorate.

Sports
Tennis
Football
Baseball
Basketball
Cheerleading
Cross Country
Dance
Lacrosse
Band
Theatre
Soccer
Swimming
Girls volleyball
Dive Team
Track and Field
Girls Flag Football
Beach Volleyball
Golf

Extracurricular activities

The school offers various clubs pertaining to a variety of interests. Each year GBHS hosts 'Club Rush' - an event located in the school's media center that allows incoming freshman and sophomore students to learn more about the current clubs available. In order for a club to be established, it must be sponsored by a member of the Gulf Breeze High faculty.

Examples of specific nationwide organizations active in Gulf Breeze High include Art Honor Society, French Honor Society, Latin Honor Society, National Technical Honor Society, Mu Alpha Theta, National Honor Society, Spanish Honor Society, Quill & Scroll, International Thespian Society.

Grade-change scandal
An investigation in 2019 revealed that former Gulf Breeze High School Assistant Principal Tori Baker changed her daughter's grades for three periods during the 2018-2019 school year, improving her class ranking from seventh to second. Following the Santa Rosa County School District Superintendent's recommendation that she be fired, Baker resigned. 

The investigation also found that Principal Danny Brothers allegedly knew the student had requested the grades be changed and failed to prevent a conflict of interest between the assistant principal and her daughter.

Notable alumni

Politics, law, and military 
Steve Mulroy, University of Memphis law professor, former Shelby County, Tennessee County commissioner

Sports
Ben Lively, professional MLB pitcher, class of 2010
Doug Baldwin, former professional NFL wide receiver, class of 2007
Doug Hudson, former profession NFL quarterback, class of 1983
Jason McKie, former professional football fullback, class of 1998
Keith Savage, former professional soccer player, class of 2003

Music, media, and art
Abigail Spencer, actress, class of 1999
Ashley Brown, actress, class of 2000
Candace Bailey, actress, class of 2001
Claire Lautier, actress, class of 1988
Gwendolyn Oxenham, writer, film producer, former soccer player, class of 1999

External links
Gulf Breeze High School website
Santa Rosa School District
Gulf Breeze Sound Wave Band

Notes

Educational institutions established in 1971
High schools in Santa Rosa County, Florida
Public high schools in Florida
1971 establishments in Florida